Gros Michel, often translated and known as "Big Mike", is an export cultivar of banana and was, until the 1950s, the main variety grown. The physical properties of the Gros Michel make it an excellent export produce; its thick peel makes it resilient to bruising during transport and the dense bunches that it grows in make it easy to ship.

Taxonomy 
Gros Michel is a triploid cultivar of the wild banana Musa acuminata, belonging to the AAA group.

Its official designation is Musa acuminata (AAA Group) 'Gros Michel'.

Synonyms include:
 Musa acuminata L. cv. 'Gros Michel'
 Musa × paradisiaca L. cv. 'Gros Michel'
Gros Michel is known as Guineo Gigante, Banano, and Plátano Roatán in Spanish. It is also known as Pisang Embun in Malaysia, Pisang Ambon in Indonesia and Philippines, Thihmwe in Burma, Chek Ambuong in Cambodia, Kluai hom thong in Thailand, and Chuoi Tieu Cao #2 in Vietnam.

Cultivation history

Early popularity and decline 

French naturalist Nicolas Baudin carried a few corms of this banana from Southeast Asia, depositing them at a botanical garden on the Caribbean island of Martinique. In 1835, French botanist Jean François Pouyat carried Baudin's fruit from Martinique to Jamaica. Gros Michel bananas were grown on massive plantations in Honduras, Costa Rica, and elsewhere in Central America.

This variety was once the dominant export banana to Europe and North America, grown in Central America but, in the 1950s, Panama disease, a wilt caused by the fungus Fusarium oxysporum f.sp. cubense, wiped out vast tracts of Gros Michel plantations in Central America, though it is still grown on non-infected land throughout the region. 

By the 1960s, the exporters of Gros Michel bananas were unable to keep trading such a susceptible cultivar, and they started growing resistant cultivars belonging to the Cavendish subgroup (another Musa acuminata AAA).

Genetic modification
There are efforts to use genetic modification to create a version of the Gros Michel which is resistant to Panama disease. There have also been successful hybrids of Cavendish and Gros Michel that display a resistance to Panama disease. 

A 2013 paper described experiments to create a version of Gros Michel which is resistant to black sigatoka, another fungal infection.

Cultural references 
"Yes! We Have No Bananas", a novelty song about a grocer from the 1922 Broadway revue Make It Snappy, is said to have been inspired by a shortage of Gros Michel bananas, which began with the infestation of Panama disease early in the 20th century.

The Gros Michel has a higher concentration of isoamyl acetate, the ester commonly used for "banana" food flavoring, than the Cavendish.

See also 
 Banana breeding impeded by triploidy
 Banana cultivar groups
 Cooking plantain
 Grand Nain (Chiquita banana)

References 

Banana cultivars